Cascaron is a Filipino doughnut made of deep-fried ground glutinous rice, grated coconut, and sugar. They are commonly ball-shaped and are sold on skewers, but they can also be elongated, pancake-shaped, or doughnut-shaped. The name is derived from Spanish cascarón ("eggshell") due to its common spherical shape and crunchy exterior. It is not to be confused with cascarón, which is a hollowed-out chicken egg filled with prizes derived from the same term.

It is known by numerous other names, depending on the region, including carioca and tinudok. It is also known as bitsu-bitsu (or bicho-bicho), not to be confused with bicho or bicho-bicho, which is a Chinese Filipino version of youtiao made with regular flour. Among the Ibanag, a variant of cascaron shaped like flattened ovals is known as pinakufu or paborot. It is also more generically known as bunuelo (also bunwelo, binuelo, binowilo, etc.), after buñuelo, the similar fritter made with regular flour from which it is derived from.

See also
 Buñuelo
 Panyalam
 Churro

References

Philippine desserts
Doughnuts
Foods containing coconut
Philippine breads